Anna Rose Thomas is a Welsh comedian who won the BBC New Comedy Award in 2021.

Life
Thomas was brought up in Burry Port in Wales.

Thomas has appeared on British TV when she won the BBC's New Comedy Award in November 2021. She came through one of the six regional heats won £1,000 and a 30-minute mentored audio slot for the BBC.

References 

Living people
Welsh comedians
Welsh women comedians
Alumni of the University of York
Year of birth missing (living people)